Voting to elect five members of the Lebanese parliament took place in the Beirut III district (one of three electoral districts in the city) in 1972, as part of the national general election of that year. Beirut III, consisting of the predominantly Muslim part of the city, had 4 Sunni Muslim seats and 1 Greek Orthodox seat (for more information about the Lebanese election system, see Elections in Lebanon).

The election in Beirut III was fiercely contested, with small margins between winning and losing sides. Two lists of candidates were in the fray in Beirut III, a list led by incumbent Prime Minister of Lebanon Saeb Salam and a list led by former Prime Minister Abdallah El-Yafi. There were also a number of independent candidates.

The election of Nasserist politician Najah Wakim, a leader of the Union of Working People's Forces, for the Greek Orthodox seat was one of the big surprises of the 1972 election. He did not run on any of the major lists, but Wakim unseated the veteran Greek Orthodox politician Nasim Majdalani. The Greek Orthodox community held a demonstration protesting against Wakim's election, arguing that he had been elected by Sunni voters.

Results

In addition to the candidates in the table above, there were eight Sunni and three Greek Orthodox candidates that each received less than 4,000 votes.

References

Elections in Lebanon
20th century in Beirut